A Good Day to Be a Dog is an upcoming South Korean television series directed by Kim Dae-woong, and starring Cha Eun-woo, Park Gyu-young and Lee Hyun-woo. It is scheduled for release in 2023.

Synopsis 
Based on Naver webtoon of the same name, it tells the story of a woman who turns into a dog when she kisses, and a man who is the only cheat key to solve the curse but is afraid of dogs.

Cast

Main 
 Cha Eun-woo as Jin Seo-won
 Park Gyu-young as Han Hae-na
 Lee Hyun-woo as Lee Bo-gyeom

Supporting 
 Yoon Hyun-soo as Choi Yul
 Lee Seo-el as Yoon Chae-ah
 Song Young-ah as Song Yi
 Kim Yi-kyung as Min Ji-ah
 Ryu Abel as Han Yu-na

Production 
Filming began in October 2022.

References

External links
 
 

Korean-language television shows
South Korean fantasy television series
South Korean romance television series
Television shows based on South Korean webtoons
2023 South Korean television series debuts
Upcoming television series